The Little Black River is a  stream in Gogebic County in the U.S. state of Michigan.

References

Rivers of Gogebic County, Michigan
Tributaries of Lake Superior
Rivers of Michigan